Dichomeris thermodryas is a moth in the family Gelechiidae. It was described by Edward Meyrick in 1923. It is found in Peru.

The forewings are fuscous, speckled with ochreous whitish. The stigmata are moderate, dark brown, the plical beneath the first discal, the second discal transverse. There is a hardly curved denticulate light brownish-ochreous subterminal line, edged posteriorly by dark brown. There is also a marginal series of dark fuscous dots separated with light ochreous around part of the costa and termen. The hindwings are rather dark grey.

References

Moths described in 1923
thermodryas